These are the 1966 Five Nations Championship squads:

England

 Terry Arthur
 Clive Ashby
 Tom Brophy
 Mike Davis
 Dick Greenwood
 Andy Hancock
 Bob Hearn
 Tony Horton
 Phil Judd
 Colin McFadyean
 John Owen
 Colin Payne
 David Perry
 Piggy Powell
 John Pullin
 Budge Rogers (c.)
 David Rosser
 Ted Rudd
 Don Rutherford
 Keith Savage
 George Sherriff
 Jeremy Spencer
 Bob Taylor
 Bill Treadwell
 Mike Weston
 Trevor Wintle

France

 Jean-Claude Berejnoi
 André Boniface
 Guy Boniface
 Jean-Michel Cabanier
 Lilian Camberabero
 Elie Cester
 Michel Crauste (c.)
 Christian Darrouy
 Benoît Dauga
 Bernard Duprat
 Jean Gachassin
 Arnaldo Gruarin
 André Herrero
 Claude Lacaze
 Marcel Puget
 Jean-Claude Roques
 Jean-Joseph Rupert
 Walter Spanghero

Ireland

 Aidan Brady
 Barry Bresnihan
 Mick Doyle
 Alan Duggan
 Kevin Flynn
 Mike Gibson
 Ray Hunter
 Ken Kennedy
 Tom Kiernan
 Ronnie Lamont
 Sean MacHale
 Willie John McBride
 Paddy McGrath
 Ray McLoughlin (c.)
 Mick Molloy
 Noel Murphy
 Oliver Waldron
 Jerry Walsh
 Roger Young

Scotland

 Colin Blaikie
 Mike Campbell-Lamerton
 David Chisholm
 Pringle Fisher
 Derrick Grant
 Alec Hastie
 Brian Henderson
 Sandy Hinshelwood
 Frank Laidlaw
 Ian Laughland
 John MacDonald
 David Rollo
 Peter Stagg
 Jim Telfer
 Jock Turner
 David Whyte
 Stewart Wilson (c.)

Wales

 Dewi Bebb
 Keith Bradshaw
 Lyn Davies
 Norman Gale
 Grahame Hodgson
 Ken Jones
 Allan Lewis
 John Lloyd
 Haydn Morgan
 Bill Morris
 Howard Norris
 Alun Pask (c.)
 Brian Price
 Terry Price
 Gareth Prothero
 Brian Thomas
 David Watkins
 Stuart Watkins
 Denzil Williams

References

External links
1966 Five Nations Championship at ESPN

Six Nations Championship squads